The 1999 FIVB Women's U20 World Championship was held in Edmonton, Canada from August 28 to September 4, 1999. 16 teams participated in the tournament. This tournament had to be played at Santo Domingo, Dominican Republic. Due to hurricane was transferred to Canada.

Qualification process

 * Canada replaced Dominican Republic due to hurricane's effects. 
 ** Turkey replaced Belgium.
 *** Venezuela replaced Peru.

Pools composition

Preliminary round

Pool A

|}

|}

Pool B

|}

|}

Pool C

|}

|}

Pool D

|}

|}

Second round

Play off – elimination group

|}

Play off – seeding group

|}

Final round

Quarterfinals

|}

5th–8th semifinals

|}

Semifinals

|}

7th place

|}

5th place

|}

3rd place

|}

Final

|}

Final standing

Individual awards

MVP:  Erika Coimbra
Best Scorer:  Ekaterina Gamova
Best Spiker:  Valeria Pouchnenkova
Best Blocker:  Sherisa Livingston
Best Server:  Barbora Novakova
Best Setter:  Song Nina
Best Receiver:  Eun-Young An
Best Libero:  Sun-Ja Son

External links
 Informative website.

World Championship
FIVB Volleyball Women's U20 World Championship
FIVB Women's Junior World Championship
1999 in youth sport